Tricuspes is an extinct genus of cynodonts that lived in what would be Europe during the Triassic from 203.6 to 199.6 mya, existing for approximately . Three species are known: Tricuspes tubingensis (Huene, 1933), Tricuspes sigogneauae (Hahn et al., 1994) and Tricuspes tapeinodon (Godefroit and Battail, 1997), which are all from the Late Triassic (Rhaetian) period in continental Europe.

Places of discovery

Teeth of Tricuspes tubingensis have been found at the following locations:

 Saint-Nicolas-de-Port
 Medernach  
 Baden-Württemberg 
 Kanton Schaffhausen

Dentition
This genus is represented only by isolated teeth found in continental Europe.  Its postcanine molariform teeth are tricuspate or tetracuspate and the tooth roots are incipiently divided.

Further reading
Zofia Kielan-Jaworowska, Richard L. Cifelli, and Zhe-Xi Luo, Mammals from the Age of Dinosaurs: Origins, Evolution, and Structure (New York: Columbia University Press, 2004), 186.

References

Prehistoric prozostrodonts
Prehistoric cynodont genera
Late Triassic synapsids of Europe
Fossil taxa described in 1933